Lipliūnai is a village in Kėdainiai district municipality, in Kaunas County, central Lithuania. It is located by the Smilga river, near the Josvainiai forest. According to the 2011 census, the village has a population of 182 people.

Demography

Gallery

References

Villages in Kaunas County
Kėdainiai District Municipality